Pristimantis ventrimarmoratus is a species of frog in the family Strabomantidae.
It is found in Bolivia, Ecuador, Peru, and possibly Brazil.
Its natural habitats are tropical moist lowland forests, swamps, and moist montane forests.

References

ventrimarmoratus
Amphibians of Bolivia
Amphibians of Ecuador
Amphibians of Peru
Amphibians described in 1912
Taxonomy articles created by Polbot